Anne Coldiron (who writes under the name A. E. B. Coldiron) is an American humanities scholar, university professor and author, working at Florida State University.

Life 

She received her PhD from the University of Virginia.

Career 

She writes about late-medieval and Renaissance literature. She usually publishes under the name A. E. B. Coldiron.

As of 2007, she was professor of English at Florida State University.

Since August 2017, she is The Berry Chair in English Literature at the University of St Andrews in Scotland (UK).

Distinctions 

She has received fellowships from the National Endowment for the Humanities and the Folger Shakespeare Library.

Bibliography 

 Canon, Period, and the Poetry of Charles of Orleans: Found in Translation  The University of Michigan Press (30 Nov. 2000) 
 English Printing, Verse Translation, and the Battle of the Sexes, 1476-1557  Routledge; 1 edition (28 Feb. 2009) 
 Printers Without Borders: Translation and Textuality in the Renaissance  Cambridge University Press (9 April 2015) 
 as editor, The Translator's Voice in Early Modern Literature and History.

References

External links
   

Year of birth missing (living people)
Living people
Florida State University faculty
University of Virginia alumni
American women non-fiction writers
American women academics
21st-century American women